Sous-Parsat is a commune in the Creuse department in the Nouvelle-Aquitaine region in central France.

Geography

Population

Sights
 The ruins of a seventeenth-century church at Mareille-au-Prieur.
 2 Roman columns.
 A washhouse and horse-trough at Le Pont.
 The church, with parts dating from the twelfth century and paintings by Gabriel Chabrat realised between in the 1980s.

See also
Communes of the Creuse department

References

External links

The church paintings, by Chabrat 

Communes of Creuse